Leray or LeRay is a surname. Notable people with the surname include:

David Leray (born 1984), French footballer
Francis Xavier Leray (1825–1887), American prelate of the Roman Catholic Church
Jean Leray (1906–1998), French mathematician
Marie-Pierre Leray (born 1975), French figure skater

See also
 Le Ray (disambiguation)